Carl Ruiterman is a drifting driver from Pukekohe, New Zealand. Carl was crowned the 2007 D1NZ champion driving a Nissan Silvia S14. He made his D1NZ debut during the 2005 season, driving a Nissan Skyline R32.

Carl raced motocross for three years. He broke his elbow while racing, so he decided to modify and tune a Nissan Skyline specifically for drag racing. While drag racing he won the C2 class during the 2005/2006 Night Speed Dragwars. After this he decided to try drifting in his Skyline. He enjoyed drifting, so he teamed up with E&H Motors to build  a serious drift car for racing competitively. Once the car was complete and Carl more experienced he began to achieve better results, culminating in his first round win at round 1 2007. He went on to win one further round and with his consistency throughout the season was crowned 'Drift King' 2007.

Carl also races in two other New Zealand drift series, Drift Revolution and NZ Drift Series. Carl's consistency in both of these championships has earned him both titles in 2007.

Carl is a manager at a workshop in Pukekohe when he is not drifting.

2007 Results 
Carl completed the 'grand slam' of New Zealand drifting by winning all three major New Zealand drifting competitions.

References

External links
Official website

New Zealand racing drivers
Living people
Drifting drivers
Sportspeople from the Auckland Region
Year of birth missing (living people)